The 27th Annual Tony Awards ceremony was held on March 25, 1973, at the Imperial Theatre in New York City, and  broadcast by ABC television. Hosts were Rex Harrison, Celeste Holm and co-hosts were Sandy Duncan and Jerry Orbach.

The ceremony
The ceremony opened with a song-and-dance medley performed by Gwen Verdon, Paula Kelly, Helen Gallagher and Donna McKechnie.

The theme was the global reach of Broadway. The "Wide World of Broadway" featured narrations by Rex Harrison, Walter Slezak, Rossano Brazzi, Yul Brynner and Peter Ustinov, who brought the viewers to: Vienna: West Side Story; Tokyo: The King and I; Milan: Ciao, Rudy; Paris: Hello, Dolly!; London: Show Boat; Zagreb, Yugoslavia: Man of La Mancha; and Wichita Falls, Texas: My Fair Lady.

Musicals represented:
 Pippin ("Magic To Do"- Ben Vereen and Company)

A new series of awards was started this year, termed "Theater Awards '73", renewable annually.

This was the fourth time that Julie Harris won a Tony Award (and her sixth nomination); she won a total of five with a sixth for Lifetime Achievement.

Winners and nominees
Winners are in bold

Special awards
These awards were given under the new title of "Theater Awards '73".
John Lindsay, Mayor of New York City (construction of legitimate theaters)
Actors' Fund of America (honored for 90 years of assistance to needy and elderly theater people)
Shubert Organization (for nearly 75 years of activity as well as for the Shubert Foundation)

Multiple nominations and awards

These productions had multiple nominations:

12 nominations: A Little Night Music
11 nominations: Pippin 
7 nominations: Much Ado About Nothing  
5 nominations: That Championship Season 
4 nominations: The Changing Room, Don't Bother Me, I Can't Cope, Irene and Sugar 
3 nominations: Butley and The Sunshine Boys 
2 nominations: Don't Play Us Cheap, The Last of Mrs. Lincoln and Lost in the Stars   

The following productions received multiple awards.

6 wins: A Little Night Music
5 wins: Pippin  
2 wins: The Last of Mrs. Lincoln and That Championship Season

References

External links
Tony Awards Official Site

Tony Awards ceremonies
1973 in theatre
1973 awards
1973 awards in the United States
1973 in New York City
1970s in Manhattan